Drunk on the Moon is the first full-length album by No Knife, released in April 1996 on Goldenrod Records. Later re-released on Time Bomb Records.

Track listing 

 "Be Mini" (Mitch Wilson) - 4:05
 "Ginger Vitus" (Matt Reese, Wilson) - 4:30
 "Habits" (Jeremy Blatchley, Reese, Wilson) - 4:46
 "Punch 'n' Judy" (Wilson) - 5:07
 "At the Heart of the Terminal" (Wilson) - 4:31
 "Kiss Your Killer" (Brian Desjean, Aaron Mancini, Wilson) - 3:38
 "Ephedrine" - (Wilson) 5:18
 "Small of My Back" (Wilson) - 5:29
 "...If I Could Float..." (Wilson) - 3:10
 "Titanic" - (Wilson) 1:02
 "Daniels" (Reese, Wilson) - 1:48

Personnel 

Mitch Wilson – guitar, vocals, artwork
Aaron Mancini – guitar
Brian Desjean – bass
Ike Zaremba – drums, backing vocals
Kym Clift – vocals
Matt Reese – vocals
Mark Trombino – tambourine, producer, recording engineer
Mark Waters - executive producer
Tod Swank - executive producer
Mike Ballard – photography
Miki Vuckovich - live photography

References

External links
 Official Homepage

1996 albums
No Knife albums